Black Masses is the seventh studio album by English doom metal band Electric Wizard, released on 1 November 2010. It is the band's only album to feature bassist Tas Danazoglou.

Background

Guitarist-vocalist Jus Oborn described the album as a "continuation of Witchcult Today in many respects," although he also sees it as part of a lineage composed of Come My Fanatics..., Supercoven, Dopethrone, and Witchcult Today. However, he does draw a contrast between Black Masses and Witchcult Today in that he views the former as "violent, aggressive" and the latter as "mellow and alluring".

"Venus in Furs" is based on the book of the same name by Leopold von Sacher-Masoch; however, the song made references to the film of the same name by Jesús Franco. As Oborn notes, "Venus in Furs" is "about evil women. Every song on the album is a meditation on a different type of evil. When you say the term 'Venus in furs,' people get the image in their mind of a dominant female. So that's our 'evil woman' song. It's a classic doom theme."

When asked about the influence of drugs upon the album, Oborn concedes

Album information
This is their first album since Electric Wizard to not feature a song longer than 10 minutes in length, although the fifth track, "Satyr IX", is close to the mark, clocking in at 9:58.

Reception

David Schalek with About.com wrote that "Black Masses has the right amount of accessible, catchy stoner laden riffs to go along with the generally heavy assault of Electric Wizard's form of Black Sabbath-descended doom metal."

Doomantia largely celebrated the album, proclaiming "if you thought Witchcult Today was too polished, then you will love Black Masses. It's an more ugly, sleazy and dirty album than Witchcult Today but it hasn't got the sickness that gets spewed at you during Dopethrone. In a way it takes all the elements from all their albums, melts them down and turns them into something different again. It's a nasty, angry beast of a recording that oozes sleaze and reeks of satanic nightmares and drug induced apocalyptic visions."

The album received some criticism, with Onemetal.com describing the album as "scattered and unfocused," with performances that are "loose to the point of bordering on sloppy," and a murky production. However, the author did concede that the album was a "grower" that improved with subsequent exposure.

Track listing
All music by Oborn, except where noted. All lyrics by Jus Oborn

Personnel

Electric Wizard
 Jus Oborn – guitar, vocals
 Liz Buckingham – guitar
 Tas Danazoglou – bass
 Shaun Rutter – drums

Guest musicians
 Edryd Turner – Mellotron on "The Nightchild"

Production and art
 Liam Watson – produced, mixed and engineered
 Justin Oborn – art, layout and design
 Ester Segarra – band photo

Release history

References

2010 albums
Electric Wizard albums
Rise Above Records albums